Mohit Kumar (born 10 November 1998) is an Indian cricketer. He made his Twenty20 debut on 19 January 2021, for Bihar in the 2020–21 Syed Mushtaq Ali Trophy.

References

External links
 

1998 births
Living people
Indian cricketers
Bihar cricketers
Place of birth missing (living people)